Auckland Transport may refer to:

Auckland Transport, the local government entity dealing with transport matters in Auckland, New Zealand
Auckland Regional Transport Authority, the predecessor of Auckland Transport
Transport in Auckland, New Zealand